Edsbyn is a locality and the seat of Ovanåker Municipality, Gävleborg County, Sweden with 3,985 inhabitants in 2010. It is located in the historical province of Hälsingland.

Edsbyn is most famous for its former ski and nowadays office furniture manufacturing industry Edsbyverken; the sports club Edsbyns IF; and being the hometown of the creator of Minecraft, Markus Persson throughout his early childhood.

Climate
Edsbyn has a subarctic climate (Köppen Dfc) with long winters with occasional strong cold periods and short but mild summers. Being situated in a river valley at a moderately high elevation surrounded by high hills, the settlement is in a frost hollow. This results in large swings between different times of the day and larger seasonal variations than seen elsewhere in Hälsingland.

Sports
The following sports clubs are located in Edsbyn:

 Edsbyns IF - bandy
 Edsbyns IF FF - football

Edsbyns IF is renowned for its successes in men's bandy. The first indoor bandy arena in Sweden, Edsbyn Arena, was built in Edsbyn and dedicated in 2003 by King Carl XVI Gustaf.

References 

 
Populated places in Ovanåker Municipality
Municipal seats of Gävleborg County
Hälsingland
Swedish municipal seats